Ahmadabad (also Romanized as Aḩmadābād; also known as Aḩmadāb Sānī ol Ḩayat) is a village in Sarpaniran Rural District, in the Central District of Pasargad County, Fars Province, Iran. At the 2006 census, its population was 61, in 18 families.

References 

Populated places in Pasargad County